Kentucky Route 303 (KY 303) is a  state highway in the U.S. state of Kentucky. The highway connects mostly rural areas of Graves County with the Tennessee state line and Mayfield.

Route description
KY 303 begins at the Tennessee state line, at an intersection with Foyshack Road, southeast of Pilot Oak, within Graves County. It travels to the north-northeast and intersects the southern terminus of KY 385. It curves to the east and then to the north-northeast. The highway then curves to the east-southeast and then to a due north direction. It has an intersection with KY 94. Right after it crosses Obion Creek, it enters Cuba. Here, the highway has an intersection with both the eastern terminus of KY 2422 and the western terminus of KY 83. KY 303 continues to the north and intersects KY 339 and then crosses over Ford Creek. The highway intersects the western terminus of KY 1890 just before it crosses over Perry Creek. It travels through South Highland. It crosses over Torian Creek and then enters Mayfield. It intersects the western terminus of KY 80 and crosses over Kess Creek before passing Highland Park Cemetery. The highway continues to the north and meets its northern terminus, an intersection with KY 121 Bus. (Paris Road). Here, the roadway continues as South 3rd Street.

Major intersections

See also

References

0303
Transportation in Graves County, Kentucky